= A. K. Clarke =

American politician

Member of the Washington House of Representatives
- In office 1889–1891

Personal details
- Party: Republican

A. K. Clarke was an American politician in the state of Washington. He served in the Washington House of Representatives from 1889 to 1891.
